The Miller Atlas, also known as Lopo Homem-Reineis Atlas, is a richly illustrated Portuguese partial world atlas dated from 1519, including a dozen charts. It is a joint work of the cartographers Lopo Homem, Pedro Reinel and Jorge Reinel, and illustrated by miniaturist António de Holanda. 

The regions represented are the North Atlantic Ocean, Northern Europe, the Azores Archipelago, Madagascar, Horn of Africa, the Indian Ocean, Indonesia, the China Sea, the Moluccas, Brazil and the Mediterranean Sea. It was acquired by the librarian Bénigne Emmanuel Clement Miller in 1855 at a bookseller in Santarém, Portugal, hence the name Miller Atlas. In 1897, his widow sold it to the National Library of France, where it has stayed ever since.

It stands out for details of the map 'Terra Brasilis', less than twenty years after the landing of Pedro Álvares Cabral. It is thought to have been an offering from King Manuel I of Portugal to Francis I of France. The charts included and its authoring raised great controversy among scholars, particularly a world map closed to the Pacific Ocean, which has been interpreted as an attempt to dissuade the circumnavigation that Ferdinand Magellan then prepared in Seville, in the court of Charles I of Spain.

Its title page bears a later inscription with the arms of Catherine de Medici with the text, "Hec est universi orbis ad hanc usqz diem cogniti / tabula quam ego Lupus homo Cosmographus / in clarissima Ulisipone civitate Anno domini nostri / Millessimo quigentessimo decimo nono jussu / Emanuelis incliti lusitanie Regis collatis pluribs / aliis tam vetustorum qz recentiorum tabulis mag / na industria et dilligenti labore depinxi."

References

Atlases
1519 books
History of cartography